The Consulate-General of the People's Republic of China in Chongjin is the consulate of China in Chongjin, North Korea. The current consul general is Zhang Daxing.

History 
The Consulate-General was established in 1987. China is one of the two countries to have a consulate in Chongjin, the other being Russia.

The consulate celebrated its 20th anniversary in 2007. The consulate expressed "deep condolences" after Kim Jong-il's death in 2011.

List of consuls

See also 

 Embassy of China, Pyongyang
 List of diplomatic missions of China
 List of diplomatic missions in North Korea
 Foreign relations of China

References

External links 
 

China–North Korea relations
Diplomatic missions of China
Diplomatic missions in North Korea